The 2011–12 Serbian Cup season was the sixth season of the Serbian national football tournament.

The competition started on 31 August 2011 and concluded with the Final on May 16, 2012.

The winner of the competition qualified for the second qualifying round of the 2012–13 UEFA Europa League.

Preliminary round
A preliminary round was held in order to reduce the number of teams competing in the next round to 32 and featured 14 teams from Serbian lower divisions. The matches were played on 31 August 2011.

Note: Roman numerals in brackets denote the league tier the clubs participated in during the 2011–12 season.

Round of 32
In this round, seven winners from the previous round were joined by all 16 teams from Serbian SuperLiga from 2010–11, as well as top 9 teams from Serbian First League from 2010–11. Draw was held on September 9, 2011. The matches have been played on 20, 21 and 27 September 2011. In total, around 23050 spectators attended the games (avg. 1441 per game).

Note: Roman numerals in brackets denote the league tier the clubs participate in during the 2011–12 season.

Round of 16
16 winners from previous round qualified for round. The draw for this round contained seeded and unseeded teams. Seedings were determined by last season's league standings. Seeded teams for this round: Partizan, Red Star, Vojvodina, Spartak Subotica, OFK Beograd, Sloboda Užice, Javor Ivanjica and Borac Čačak. Unseeded teams: Smederevo, Jagodina, Metalac, Inđija (II), Radnički 1923, Banat (II), Proleter Novi Sad (II) and Kolubara (II).The draw took place on 29 September 2011. The matches were played on 25 and 26 October 2011. In total, around 14100 spectators attended the games (avg. 1763 per game).

Note: Roman numerals in brackets denote the league tier the clubs participate in during the 2011–12 season.

Quarter-finals
The eight winners from the Second Round qualified for this round. The draw for this round took place on 2 November 2011.  Teams were seeded and unseeded based on the last season's league standings. Seeded teams: Partizan, Red Star, Vojvodina and Spartak Subotica. Unseeded teams: OFK Beograd, Javor Ivanjica, Borac Čačak and Smederevo. The matches took place on November 23, 2011. In total, around 6500 spectators attended the games (avg. 1625 per game).

Semi-finals
The four winners from the previous round qualified for the semi-finals. As in the 2010-11 Serbian Cup the semi-finals were played over two legs. First leg matches were scheduled for March 21, 2012. The second legs were played on April 11, 2012. There was no seeding in the draw for this round.

|}

First legs

Second legs

Final
The two winners from the semi-finals qualified for the Final. The game was played on May 16, 2012 at Mladost stadium in Kruševac. Game was originally to be organized on Karađorđe stadium in Novi Sad.

Top goalscorers

References

External links
 Official site

Serbian Cup seasons
Cup
Serbian Cup